BLM most commonly refers to:

 Black Lives Matter, an international anti-racism movement and organization
 Bureau of Land Management, a U.S. federal government agency

BLM may also refer to:

Organizations
 BLM (law firm), United Kingdom and Ireland
 Blue Lives Matter, an American pro-police movement
Black Lives Matter Global Network Foundation

Places

Administrative divisions
 Saint Barthélemy's ISO 3166-1 alpha-3 country code

Buildings
 BLM Geothermal Plant, a near Ridgecrest, California, United States
 BLM Group Arena, Trento, Trentino, Italy
 Braunschweigisches Landesmuseum, a history museum in Brunswick, Lower Saxony, Germany

Science and technology
 Biotic Ligand Model, toxicology tool
 Black lipid membranes, in cell biology
 Bleomycin, a cancer medication
 Bloom syndrome protein, in genetics
 BLM protein, a helicase
 Basic Language Machine, an early 1960s computer by John Iliffe

Transportation
 Bergbahn Lauterbrunnen-Mürren, a railway line in Switzerland
 Blue Sky Airlines, a defunct Armenian airline, ICAO code 
 Monmouth Executive Airport, New Jersey, US, IATA code